Almanac of Fall is a 1984 Hungarian film directed by Béla Tarr.

Plot
In a grim, claustrophobic apartment owned by a rich elderly woman, the inhabitants desperately try to relate to each other as they go about their bleak lives revealing their darkest secrets, fears, obsessions and hostilities. They include besides her, her son, her nurse, her nurse's discontented lover, and a new lodger.

Reception
Almanac of Fall continues to receive positive reviews from critics, mainly for its cinematography. Rotten Tomatoes reports 100% approval among six critics, with an average rating of 8.1/10. Jonathan Rosenbaum of the Chicago Reader lauded the film's "elaborately choreographed mise en scene" and "highly unorthodox angles," while a review in Strictly Film School argues, "Tarr [...] uses highly stylized, artificially colored lighting, rigorous (and deliberate) formalism, minimalist setting, and protracted dialogue to create an atmospherically charged and disquieting environment."

Almanac of Fall has since come to be regarded as a decisive moment in Tarr's filmography, in which he abandoned the documentary-like realism of his early work and adopted a formal style of cinematography. "This is the turning point for Béla Tarr, leaving social realism behind to step into the existential abyss," wrote Jeremiah Kipp reviewing the film for Slant magazine. Jeremy Heilman of Movie Martyr called it "Tarr's first feature that could be described as the work of a formalist" and noted retrospectively that the film "offers a first sign of the hint of supernatural control that would continue to crop up in each of Tarr's subsequent features."

Cast
Hédi Temessy as Hédi 
Erika Bodnár as Anna 
Miklós B. Székely as Miklós 
Pál Hetényi as Tibor 
János Derzsi as János, Hédi fia

References

External links

 

1985 drama films
1985 films
Films directed by Béla Tarr
Hungarian drama films
1980s Hungarian-language films